Regina T. Boyce (born August 7, 1976) is an American politician who currently serves in the Maryland House of Delegates. Delegate Boyce is a Democrat who represents the 43rd Legislative District of the state of Maryland.

Background
Boyce was born on August 7, 1976, in Washington, DC. She graduated from the Woodlawn High School in Baltimore County, Maryland and later attended Catonsville Community College and Towson University, where she earned a B.S. degree in kinesiology and psychology in 1998, and the University of Baltimore, where she earned a M.P.A. degree in 2014. After graduating, she became the director of the Adult Learning Center for Strong City Baltimore.

Boyce ran for the Maryland House of Delegates in 2018, her first run for elective office. During the primary election, she formed a slate with state Senator Joan Carter Conway and state Delegate Maggie McIntosh.

In the Legislature
Boyce was sworn in as a member of the Maryland House of Delegates on January 9, 2019.

In April 2019, Boyce resigned from the Legislative Black Caucus of Maryland ahead of the vote to protest comments made by Delegate Darryl Barnes, the caucus chair, that she found "unacceptable and infuriating". Barnes had cast doubt about whether African-American members of the House of Delegates would want to vote for "a white lesbian" – referring to Maggie McIntosh, who is openly gay – in the election to nominate a new Speaker of the Maryland House of Delegates.

In August 2021, Boyce was appointed to a commission to study Maryland state parks and make recommendations on new parks in "recreational deserts" and upgrades to existing parks.

In 2023, Speaker Adrienne Jones announced Boyce as one of two Chief Deputy Whips.

Committee assignments
 Member, Environment and Transportation Committee, 2019–present (environment subcommittee, 2019–present; natural resources, agriculture & open space subcommittee, 2019–present; motor vehicle & transportation subcommittee, 2020–present)
 Member, State Park Investment Commission, 2021–present

Other memberships
 Member, Maryland Legislative Latino Caucus, 2019–present
 Member, Maryland Legislative Transit Caucus, 2019–present
 Member, Women Legislators of Maryland, 2019–present
 Past member, Legislative Black Caucus of Maryland, 2019

Political positions

Elections
During the 2021 legislative session, Boyce introduced legislation that would ban people from holding an elected public office and a political party office simultaneously.

Environment
During the 2020 legislative session, Boyce introduced legislation to ban the intentional release of balloons.

During the 2022 legislative session, Boyce introduced legislation that would require government agencies to evaluate the environmental impacts of their actions.

Policing
In 2019, Boyce voted against a bill that would allow Johns Hopkins University to form its own private police force. The bill passed through the Baltimore City Delegation by a vote of 9-4. She later voted against it in the House of Delegates, where it passed 94-42. In the same legislative session, she voted against legislation that would allow school resource officers to carry guns inside schools. The bill was rejected in a 10-5 vote.

Electoral history

References

External links
 

African-American state legislators in Maryland
21st-century American politicians
Democratic Party members of the Maryland House of Delegates
Living people
21st-century American women politicians
Politicians from Washington, D.C.
Women state legislators in Maryland
1976 births
21st-century African-American women
21st-century African-American politicians
20th-century African-American people
20th-century African-American women